Borsieri's sign or Borsieri's line is a dermatological sign that consists of pressure by a sharp object (such as a fingernail) producing a white line on the skin that quickly turns red. It is present in scarlet fever. It was first described by French physician .

References

Dermatologic signs
Medical signs